In sociology, desecularization (also spelled desecularisation) is the proliferation or growth of religion, usually after a period of prior secularization. The theory of desecularization is reactionary to the older theory known as the Secularization Thesis, which posited a gradual decline of religion to a point of extinction. In the last few decades, scholars have pointed to continued church attendance in Western countries, the rise in religious fundamentalism, and the prevalence of religious conflict as evidence of the continued relevance of religion in the modern world. A former proponent of the earlier secularization thesis, Peter L. Berger, has now expressed his support for the newer theory, stating that the world today "is as furiously religious as it ever was". The skeptic Michael Shermer wrote: "At the beginning of the twentieth century social scientists predicted that belief in God would decrease by the end of the century because of the secularization of society. In fact… the opposite has occurred… Never in history have so many, and such a high percentage of the population believed in God. Not only is God not dead, as Nietzsche proclaimed, but he has never been more alive."

Background 

Many scholars of the 19th century posited that the world was undergoing a process of secularization. Individuals such as Emile Durkheim, Max Weber, Karl Marx, and Sigmund Freud believed that this trend would continue until religion became essentially insignificant in the public sphere. At the least it was believed that religion would become "privatized." The secularization thesis was underscored by rationalism, an argument born from the Age of Enlightenment. According to Norris and Inglehart, the traditional view of 19th century secularization can be divided into two perspectives (1) 'Demand-Side theories' and (2) 'Supply Side Theories.'

Demand-side theories 
Demand-side theories of secularization insist that the phenomenon occurs "bottom up," such that as a whole, the general population will become increasingly rational independent of any influence from the secular government or religious leadership body.

Examples of demand-side theories can be found in the accounts given by Weber and Durkheim. Whilst Weber rarely used the term "secularization," he is generally given credit for alluding to the idea that religion was gradually losing its prominence in society. According to Weber, the world was initially seen as unified, with religion, politics and economics all existing on the same social plane. Thus the term "religion" was not necessary nor was it widely used because religion was included in all aspects of life. According to Weber, when different aspects of society such as politics and economics were severed from religion, the demise of religion in the public sphere became inevitable.

Supply-side theories 
Supply-side theories of secularization argue that the demand for religion exerted by the general population remains constant. This means that any change in the religious landscape occurs as a result of the manipulation of the "supply market" by religious leaders. The construction therefore views the phenomenon as 'top down' development. Steve Bruce argues that the "supply" of religion is greatest when there is a "free" and "competitive" market for "providers" of religion, as in most Western nations, as opposed to states where one religion predominates.

In sociology literature

Terminology and definition 

The term "desecularization" appears in the title of Peter L. Berger's seminal work The Desecularization of the World: Resurgent Religion and World Politics. According to Karpov, the term has received little analysis in the field of sociology, however this section will refer to at least one significant development in the term's definition since its first use.  

Berger explains that the assumption that the modern world is secular has been “falsified." In another article online, he acknowledges that his original use of the term simply referred to “the continuing strong presence of religion in the modern world.” Karpov has since developed the definition of the term, which Berger subsequently affirmed. Karpov defines the term as referring to a phenomenon that is counter-secularization and thus is reactionary to a prior period of secularism. He states that desecularization can be defined as "the growth of religion's societal influence," but only if it develops in response to "previously secularizing trends." Therefore, Karpov's development of the term essentially limited the definition to instances where religion was actively re-established as opposed to simply a state of continuity.

Methodological concerns 
Some scholars raise the issue of evidence. Vyacheslav Karpov for example, mounts a discussion on the different analytics that can be used in providing evidence for desecularizing trends. He divides these analytics into two different types of evidence, (1) societal-level data or "macro-data" and (2) non-societal data, named in Karpov's article as “mega data." Macro-data deals with evidence obtained from individual societal “units.” These units cannot exclusively be referred to as countries or nation-states because sometimes they can represent smaller sections, i.e. racial groups. Other data ("mega-data") is less objective according to Karpov, because it often refers to trends in more abstract terms such as in “modern society” or civilization generally. Essentially, mega-data attempts to identify patterns on a more cosmic or global scale, whereas macro data can be very specific to nations, cities and racial groups such as church attendance and census results.

Because the term "desecularization" has been used to describe a global trend, the question raised by Karpov is whether macro-data analytics can be considered as valid when they indicate specific trends in “societal units,” rather than global trends. There are two primary critiques of macro analytics: (1) that it leads to “methodological nationalism,” causing a fixation on nation-states rather than broader civilization. The next argument is that of (2) temporal limitation – the concern that because our current concept of “society” is relatively recent, a focus on societal-level analytics (macro data) restricts sociological analysis to modernity and no other time period. According to Karpov this poses an issue when considering religions with ancient historical trajectories.

Karpov also cites several implications that result from using “mega” analytics, overall suggesting that it can allow for an understanding of desecularization that is rooted both in its historical trajectory, and its presence in modernity. He concludes that whilst “macro” data can limit the analysis of desecularization, it can be compounded and used in conjunction with “mega” analytics to give sociologists a clear overall picture of a religious trend.

Examples

Percentage of the irreligious in the world is in decline 

According to Pew Research's article The Future of World Religions: Population Growth Projections, 2010-2050: "Atheists, agnostics and other people who do not affiliate with any religion – though increasing in countries such as the United States and France – will make up a declining share of the world's total population."

Professor Eric Kaufmann, whose academic specialization is how demography affects irreligion/religion/politics, wrote in 2012:

Sociologist Phil Zuckerman's global studies on atheism have indicated that global atheism may be in decline due to irreligious countries having the lowest birth rates in the world and religious countries having higher birth rates in general.

The Center for the Study of Global Christianity (CSGC) at Gordon–Conwell Theological Seminary is an academic research center that monitors worldwide demographic trends in Christianity.  According to CSGC, the number of atheists, agnostics and nonreligious is expected to decline between the years of 2019 and 2050.

Church membership in the United States 
Finke and Stark state that church adherence in the U.S. from 1776 to 2000 has increased from an estimated 17% to 62% of the population. They argue that the religious landscape in the 20th and 21st centuries only appear to be fading in significance because traditional routes of religious worship are being replaced by new wave religiosity. Finally, they claim that populations in the modern world are moving away from traditional or established denominations such as Catholicism and participating in religious affairs in a more individualized sense. For example, Finke and Stark argue that the colonial period was not as religious as once thought, using church membership as an indicator of religiosity. Instead they suggest that the onset of globalization and religious pluralism is responsible for a higher proportion of church involvement when compared with the monolithic, traditional histories of the mainstream churches.

Orthodox Christianity in Russia 

Christopher Marsh explains the secularization in Russia before the collapse of the Soviet Union, stating that the regime was underscored by “scientific atheism,” which was ultimately manifested in the persecution of religious clergy in Russia throughout the duration of the regime. This secularization was indicated in the surveys conducted between 1981 and 1990, that showed a sharp decline in religious and supernatural beliefs, particularly in young people. In Lambert's study, 12 variables were used in the survey to denote religiosity, which included propensity to pray, belief in an afterlife etc. Furthermore, in a study conducted by Evans and Northmore-Ball, 80 percent of individuals claimed to be Russian Orthodox in 2007, with only half of the population doing the same in 1993, immediately after the collapse of the Soviet Union. Both Berger and Karpov use this evidence to bolster their accounts of desecularization in the present.

Evangelicalism in Russia 
A large number of missionaries presently operating in Russia are from Protestant denominations.

According to a survey conducted at the end of 2013, 2% of surveyed Russians identify as Protestants or another branch of Christianity.

Religious resurgence in France 
France has Europe's second largest Immigrant Muslim population.

Desecularization in Germany 

On March 17, 2014, the news website Deutsche Welle reported that evangelical Christianity has doubled in Germany in the last 10 years.

Germany has the largest immigrant community of Muslims in Europe.

Desecularization in East Asia 
Zeng discusses the increasingly religious paradigm within civil service entrance examinations - tests which are intended to sort applicants for civil service and "justify social hierarchy," as well as academic examinations for school and university. The study uses ethnographic evidence and interviews with civil servants to provide evidence for this phenomenon. Zeng highlights the systemic use of emas - prayer symbols that are used in Shintoism and other East-Asian religions, to invoke positive outcomes in entrance exams. According to Zeng, these are sufficiently prevalent in some parts of Japan such that individual universities such as Keio University in Tokyo, offer their own prayer templates for prospective students. Zeng also found that in two separate non-academic shrines in Japan, more than half of the emas were directed toward such exams. The number of Chinese Christians has increased significantly; from 4 million before 1949 to 67 million in 2010. Christianity has grown in South Korea, from 2.0% in 1945 to 29.3% in 2010.

Responses to the desecularization thesis 
The conflicting secularization and desecularization theses and their application to modernity have occasioned much debate. Some 20th and 21st century scholars have argued that the Secularization Thesis is not nullified and that the term 'desecularization' can only be applied in isolated, societal circumstances. Bryan R. Wilson has suggested that commercialism continues to undermine religion in relation to religious bodies such as the Church, and non-religious bodies such as the family unit and economic institutions.

Critics of the contemporary theory of desecularization such as Wilson still concede that religiosity is not trending towards extinction because of continued religious piety across the globe. However, they do argue that its relationship with political and economic institutions is indeed declining because of the increased pressure from the scientific and technological spheres. They argue that this proposition is both plausible in modernity and compatible with 19th century conceptions of Secularization that foreshadowed religion's "privatization," if not extinction. Hence, critics of desecularization suggest that whilst it can account for some instances of continued and revised religiosity, it does not adequately describe the relationship between religion and privatized inquisitions and governments.

Mouzelis suggests that this case is "strong," however it only refers to "inter-institutional" secularization (i.e. the relationship between religion and other institutions). He offers the opinion that the argument against desecularization becomes weakened when one considers "developments within the religious sphere proper," or what he calls "intra-institutional" secularization. Similarly, Martin uses evidence of increased Pentecostalism in both developed and non-developed countries (particularly the U.S.) to bolster the argument for desecularization. Bruce offers a rebuttal to this point, claiming that the United States is simply slower to become secular due to certain structural predispositions, namely the steady rate of migration.

Bruce also suggests that the dramatic changes to religiosity in the modern world such as increased liberalism, represent evidence of its decline. According to Bruce, this trajectory could have begun with the transition from medieval Catholicism to the Protestant reformation under Martin Luther. Mouzelis describes this as a potentially weak argument in that most proponents of desecularization would simply view events such as the Reformation as a religious development or the birth of a new type of Christianity, which could have the potential to further globalize its consumption.

Among these dramatic changes in religion, according to Bruce, is the deterioration of supernatural elements of religiosity, leaving behind a belief system that its more morally grounded a development which represents a "retardation" of religion. Again, Mouzelis takes a more objective stance, suggesting that this development can be seen as both evidence for and against desecularization because such movements can still capitulate the globalization of certain faiths.

Overall, critics of desecularization tend to argue that whilst religious enthusiasm is not necessarily in decline, the significance of religion in the public sphere, and as a limb of political and economic institutions, is indeed continually diminished by modernity. This can be described as the "privatization" of religion. However, desecularization proponents tend to suggest that these aforementioned changes represent religious developments rather than religious declines, and therefore cannot be used as evidence of general secularizing trend.

See also 
Growth of religion
Postsecularism

References

External links 
Desecularization by Peter L. Berger, The American Interest, May 13, 2015
Think religion is in decline? Look at who is ‘going forth and multiplying’, Vancouver Sun, 2014
Shall the Religious Inherit the Earth?: Demography and Politics in the Twenty-First Century by Eric Kaufmann, Belfer Center, Harvard University/Birkbeck College, University of London (PDF)

Religious studies
Cultural studies
Secularism
Sociology of religion